John Begget (1896–1965) was an English football player and manager.

Career
During his playing career, Begget played for Aston Villa.

After his playing days, Begget moved to Turkey, being appointed manager of Galatasaray in 1941. Begget stayed at Galatasaray until 1945. Under Begget's stewardship, Galatasaray won two Istanbul Football Cups.

References

1896 births
1965 deaths
Association footballers not categorized by position
English footballers
English football managers
Sportspeople from Hereford
Aston Villa F.C. players
Galatasaray S.K. (football) managers
Expatriate football managers in Turkey
English expatriate sportspeople in Turkey